Electroacoustic or Electroacoustics may refer to:
 Electroacoustics (acoustical engineering), a branch of acoustical engineering
 Electro-acoustic guitar, a type of guitar
 Electroacoustic music, a variety of experimental music

See also
 Electro-Acoustic Ensemble, a laptop-based ensemble at Loyola University New Orleans